Abdelhay Laatiri is a Tunisian football manager.

References

Year of birth missing (living people)
Living people
Tunisian football managers
ES Hammam-Sousse managers
Najran SC managers
EO Sidi Bouzid managers
Tunisian Ligue Professionnelle 1 managers
Tunisian expatriate football managers
Expatriate football managers in Saudi Arabia
Tunisian expatriate sportspeople in Saudi Arabia
Saudi Professional League managers